is a 2022 Japanese animated film based on Natsuki Takaya's Fruits Basket manga series. Produced by TMS Entertainment and distributed by Avex Pictures, the film consists of a recap of the series' 2019 anime adaptation, a prequel story titled Kyoko and Katsuya's Story that focuses on Tohru Honda's late parents, and an original epilogue story written by Takaya. It stars Miyuki Sawashiro, Yoshimasa Hosoya, Manaka Iwami, Nobunaga Shimazaki and Yuma Uchida.

A new anime focusing on Tohru's late parents was announced at the end of the 2019 anime's finale episode. In October 2021, it was revealed to be part of a compilation film, with the main cast and staff of the 2019 anime returning. Fruits Basket: Prelude premiered in Japan on February 18, and has grossed million at the Japanese box office.

Plot
Kyo Sohma has been plagued by guilt since he allowed Kyoko Honda, a woman he'd known as a young child, to die in order to avoid exposing his curse. Somehow, against all odds, he met her daughter Tohru, and the two fell in love. But before there was Kyo and Tohru, or even Kyo and Kyoko, there was Kyoko and Katsuya. Kyoko was a troubled teen; Katsuya a student teacher with no actual interest in education. Apart, they were a pair of misfits; together, they made Tohru.

Voice cast

Production
After the airing of the finale episode of the 2019 anime adaptation in June 2021, a new anime that focuses on Tohru's parents, titled , and a stage play adaptation of the original manga were announced. In October 2021, a compilation film titled Fruits Basket: Prelude was announced, consisting of a recap of the 2019 anime series, the Kyо̄ko to Katsuya no Monogatari anime, and new epilogue scenes written by Natsuki Takaya, the original author. Miyuki Sawashiro, Yoshimasa Hosoya, Manaka Iwami, Nobunaga Shimazaki, and Yuma Uchida were reprising their roles from the 2019 anime. The series' main staff, including Yoshihide Ibata as the director, Taku Kishimoto as the screenwriter, Masaru Shindō as the character designer, Masaru Yokoyama as the composer, and animation studio TMS Entertainment, were also returning for the film. In December 2021, Ohashi Trio was revealed to be performing the film's theme song, titled .

Marketing
The first poster featuring Kyoko and Katsuya was released in October 2021. A teaser trailer and a second poster featuring the Honda family were revealed in December 2021. A second trailer was released in January 2022.

Release

Theatrical
Fruits Basket: Prelude premiered in 25 theaters in Japan on February 18, 2022. Multiple items were given to moviegoers during different weeks of the film's screening: a 20-page booklet containing a manga adaptation of the film's epilogue story, a replica key frame from the 2019 anime depicting Kyo and Tohru hugging, and postcards drawn by character designer Masaru Shindō.

Golden Harvest premiered the film in Hong Kong on June 9. Crunchyroll acquired the film's distribution rights in the United States, Canada, and the United Kingdom. The company screened the film on June 25, 28, and 29 in the U.S. and Canada, in Japanese and with an English dub, and on July 20 in the UK with only the dub.

Home media
The film was released on Blu-ray in Japan on June 24, 2022. It included an original eight-page manga written by Takaya. A limited edition Blu-ray was sold in theaters during the film's screening. Crunchyroll began streaming the film on October 6, 2022, with both Japanese and English language options.

Reception

Box office
Fruits Basket: Prelude grossed million in Japan.

In its first four days, the film earned million at the Japanese box office. It reached million in its second weekend. After 18 days in theaters, the film earned million (million).

Critical response
The Japanese review aggregator Filmarks reported that the film received an average rating of 4.24 based on 142 reviews, placing first in its first-day satisfaction ranking.

References

External links
  
 

2022 anime films
Animated films based on animated television series
Anime films based on manga
Fruits Basket
Japanese animated films
TMS Entertainment
Prequel films
Japanese prequel films